The Jeju Black is a Korean breed of domestic pig. It is named for, and originates from, the large island of Jeju-do, which lies to the south of the country in the Korea Strait. It is a small pig with a black skin and smooth coat of hair. It has erect, unfolded ears and a narrow snout.

Under a co-operative agreement between North and South Korea, about US$160,000 worth of equipment was shipped in 2008 from Jeju Island to North Korea to build a Jeju Black pig farm in Pyongyang; breeding stock was to follow when the farm was ready.

As food
Pork from the Jeju Black is said to have a unique taste, and forms the basis of some local dishes. It is smoked over burning hay, which gives it an unusual flavour and a chewy consistency.

Until the later twentieth century, these pigs were kept to dispose of human waste. They were housed in sites built below the outside latrines where their "food" was directly delivered. From the 1960s, this practice gave way to more conventional feeding. Some believe that the change has adversely affected the flavour of the meat.

See also

 List of smoked foods

References

Pig breeds originating in Korea
Smoked meat